MKB Bank, formerly Magyar Külkereskedelmi Bank, is the second-biggest commercial bank in Hungary. Its privatization started in 1994 when BayernLB purchased a minority stake. The Hungarian government bought it back in 2014. In 2020 they became part of the Magyar Bankholding Zrt (with Budapest Bank and MTB Bank). In 2022 Budapest Bank merged to MKB (becoming the second largest bank in Hungary), and MTB Bank will be merged to the bank as well – but then under the name of MBH Bank.

History 
MKB Bank is one of the oldest banks in the country as it began operating in 1950. The purpose of its establishment was to participate in the international monetary system and manage financial transactions related to foreign trade. In 1987 Hungary established a dual banking system and MKB received full operational licensure to service the general population.

Politicalt Ties 
MKB Bank has financed by loan the campaign of French presidential candidate, Marine le Pen. The recently-published asset declarations of France’s presidential candidates reveal that she received some EUR 10.7 million in total.

See also

 List of companies of Hungary
 List of banks in Hungary
 Economy of Hungary
 List of banks
 MKB Unionbank

References

Banks of Hungary
Companies listed on the Budapest Stock Exchange
Companies based in Budapest
Banks established in 1950
Hungarian brands
1950 establishments in Hungary